"Smooth Operator" is a song by English band Sade from their debut studio album, Diamond Life (1984). It was released as the album's third single in the United Kingdom as a 7-inch single with "Spirit" as its B-side, and as a 12-inch maxi single with "Smooth Operator" and "Red Eye" on side A and "Spirit" on side B. Released on 28 August 1984, it reached number 19 on the UK Singles Chart.

In the United States, "Smooth Operator" was released in February 1985, serving as the album's second US single. The song became Sade's first top-10 entry in the US, peaking at number five on the Billboard Hot 100 for two weeks in May 1985. It spent 13 weeks in the top 40, and also topped the Billboard Adult Contemporary chart for two weeks. 

Although "Your Love Is King" remains Sade's highest-peaking single in the UK to date, "Smooth Operator" is the band's breakthrough single on the US charts, and their most successful single internationally.

Background
Ray St. John, who co-wrote "Smooth Operator" with Sade Adu, was previously a member of Adu's former band Pride, although he was not a member of the band Sade. The pair co-wrote the song in 1982 while still members of Pride, but did not get around to recording it because St. John left Pride shortly after Sade joined.

Composition and lyrics
"Smooth Operator" is about a fashionable con-man who moves within high social circles. He is popular with women and breaks many hearts. The lyrics "Coast to coast, LA to Chicago, western male / Across the north and south, to Key Largo, love for sale" imply that he also uses women to obtain his income. It is also clear that he does not hold sincere affection for these women, as Adu sings near the end, "his heart is cold".

The video to this song reinforces the message and the operator, played by actor Michael Feast, appears to be a professional criminal.  In one scene, he displays a gun to an interested customer, and in others, he appears to be a pimp. Apparently, he succeeds in evading law enforcement, who have him under surveillance. In the video, the operator cheats on Sade with a waitress of the nightclub (played by actress Amanda Pays). However, as revealed in the extended version of the video which contains the composition "Red Eye" (the next song on 12-inch single), Sade, cooperating with the police, hides behind the nightclub equipment and sees the criminal return to the club. Then she bumps into a box, causing  a noise, and the criminal chases after her. When the police arrive outside, he tries to escape from them from rooftop to rooftop until he is shot and then falls from a rooftop to his death.

This song is noted for Adu's spoken recitation in the song's introduction. Some radio edits have omitted the spoken introduction and proceeded with the opening sung line of the title of the album, "Diamond Life".  Some radio edits have shortened the instrumental saxophone solo, as well as the first repeat of the lines that come after the chorus portions.

Reception
Tanya Rena Jefferson of AXS stated: "The warm tonal voice of Sade sings about a smooth operator con artist lover boy. 'Smooth Operator' reached number 1 on the Billboard Adult Contemporary charts in 1985." Sophie Heawood of The Guardian commented: "Arguably the band's signature single, the accuracy with which its suave music, complete with sax solo, conveyed the business-class lifestyle of its subject set the tone for how they would be perceived over their entire career. As a credo, 'We move in space with minimum waste and maximum joy' remains revelatory." Frank Guan of Vulture commented: "Along with an ace lead saxophone and winding bass line, the secret to success for Sade's biggest early hit is hiding in plain sight: the heartless playboy traversing cities and continents in search of pleasure that she narrates serves as an allegory for Global Capitalism, but also for herself: her international range and her voice – every time she croons 'smooth operator', there's a measure of self-reference. Her amoral protagonist's villainy is rendered in such lovely phrases that the listener can't help but be seduced."

Track listings

UK, US, Dutch, and Australian 7-inch single
A. "Smooth Operator" – 4:15
B. "Spirit" – 5:28

UK, US, Canadian, Dutch, and Japanese 12-inch maxi single
A1. "Smooth Operator" – 5:25
A2. "Red Eye" – 3:18
B. "Spirit" – 5:28

Charts

Weekly charts

Year-end charts

Certifications

See also
 List of number-one adult contemporary singles of 1985 (U.S.)

References

1980s ballads
1984 singles
1984 songs
Epic Records singles
Music videos directed by Julien Temple
Portrait Records singles
Sade (band) songs
Songs about prostitutes
Songs written by Ray St. John
Songs written by Sade (singer)